Mazengia Demma Soru (Ge'ez: ማዘንግያ ደማ ሶሩ; born July 26, 1970) is an Ethiopian businessman and investor. He has business interests in international trade and gemstone mining.

References

Living people
1970 births
Ethiopian businesspeople